Natalya Fyodorovna Merkulova (born 19 September 1979 in Orenburg Oblast) is a Russian filmmaker. She is well known for her films which she directs together with her husband Aleksey Chupov. Her directorial debut  (2013, co-directed with Aleksey Chupov) was included in the Kinotavr film festival and won an award for the best debut, and The Man Who Surprised Everyone (2018, codirected with Aleksey Chupov)  that was a members for the Horizons (Orizzonti) section of 75th Venice International Film Festival.

Her 2021 film Captain Volkonogov Escaped (codirected with Aleksey Chupov) was selected for the main competition at the 78th Venice International Film Festival.

References

External links
 

1979 births
Russian film directors
Living people
Russian screenwriters
Women screenwriters
Russian women film directors